The Countship of Larvik (also spelt Laurvig or Laurvigen) was created on 29 September 1671 when Brunla amt was made into the county of Laurvigen. It covered today's Larvik and Tjøme municipality, and parts of Sandefjord municipality (Sandar and Kodal). 

In 1821 the county was merged with Jarlsberg County to become Jarlsberg and Larvik amt.

The county was created by king Christian V for general and Statholder (viceroy) of Norway, Ulrik Frederik Gyldenløve, illegitimate son of king Frederik III.

Laurvig was intended to be the leading countship in Denmark-Norway: "hvilket Grevskab skal for vores Rigers første Grevskab herefter holdes og agtes skal.". The count's estate comprised the former Brunla, Fritsø and Halsen estates and the Lange family's former estate. It also included the towns of Larvik and Sandefjord, and significant industry: Fritzøe Ironworks and Fritzøe sawmill. Most of the count's properties are today owned by the Treschow family. Gyldenløve built a manor named Herregården in what was then the outskirts of Larvik. The building was started in 1674 and completed in time for Gyldenløve's third wedding, with Antoinette Augusta von Aldenburg, on August 16, 1677.

The coat of arms is blazoned as follows: "I blåt en oprejst, kronet hvidspættet løve med hovedet set for fra ("leopard") i en krum gul hellebard. Om skjoldet to grønne palmegrene med blå sløjfe, og på skjoldet en grevekrone.".

House of Gyldenløve 

Gyldenløve was naturalised in 1655. In 1671 he received the title Count of Larvik, but he never used it. The titles could be inherited by both his male and female descendants after a further determination of succession. By patent of 11 February 1692, succession was changed, so that only Gyldenløve's sons and their male descendants could inherit.

Coat of arms blazoned: "Et hvidt kors mellem 1. og 4. se grevskabet Laurvig, 2. og 3. sinister skrådelt af hvidt over gult og omvendt, 1 grevekronet rødt midterskjold to gående, kronede gule løver bag et hvidt kors. På skjoldet en grevekrone og en gul "leopard" som holder 2 x 3 Danneborgsfaner. To hvide elefanter.".

"A cross argent between, 1st and 4th quarters, for the county of Laurvig, 2nd and 3rd quarters a bend sinister of argent and Or counterchanged, over all a count's coronet gules ..."

 1671–1704 Count Ulrik Fredrik Gyldenløve

House of Danneskiold-Laurvig 
Patent 1695 for Ulrik Frederik Gyldenløve's children with Countess Antoinette Augusta of Aldenburg, in the name Danneskiold-Laurvig.

Coat of arms blazoned: "Som Gyldenløve, ovenfor, dog med følgende forskelle: midterskjoldet ikke kronet og løverne foran korset; et kronet hjerteskjold med et kronet gult F3 i rødt; på hovedskjoldet en "antik" krone; løven øverst med antik krone; dekster elefant erstattet af gul løve med hjelm med antik krone og hvide hejrefjer.".

 1704–1754 Count Ferdinand Anton Danneskiold-Laurvig

 1754–1762 Count Frederik Ludvig Danneskiold-Laurvig
 1762–1783 Count Christian Conrad Danneskiold-Laurvig

House of Ahlefeldt-Laurvig

Granted in 1785 by the Supreme Court to major general Christian Ahlefeldt (1732-1791), count of Langeland with name Ahlefeldt-Laurvigen. He was the son-in-law of one of Gyldenløve's daughters. In 1805 his son, Count Frederik Ahlefeldt-Laurvig, sold the county of Laurvig together with Fritzø Ironworks to the king. However the family continued to use the name Ahlefeldt-Laurvig or Ahlefeldt-Laurvigen. The king sold the county again by royal resolution of August 26, 1817.

Coat of arms blazoned: "Hvidt kors mellem 1. og 4. grevskabet Laurvig, 2. og 3. lodret delt af grevskabet Langeland og gult, hvori to røde fisk mellem tolv sorte græske kors. Grevekronet midterskjold, se Ahlefeldt. Hjelmfigurer: grevekrone; gul ørn; Danneskiold-Laurvig og Ahlefeldt. Skjoldholdere: se Danneskiold-Laurvig."

1785–1791 Count Christian Ahlefeldt-Laurvig

1791–1805 Count Frederik Ahlefeldt-Laurvig

House of Ahlefeldt-Laurvig-Bille 
Patent 1883 for count J. L. Ahlefeldt-Laurvigen with name Ahlefeldt-Laurvig-Bille.

Coat of arms: "Hvidt kors mellem, 1. og 4. Bille, 2. og 3. grevskaberne Laurvig og Langeland; grevekronet midterskjold: se Ahlefeldt. Hjelmfigurer: grevekrone; Danneskiold-Laurvig, Ahlefeldt og Bille. Skjoldholdere: se Danneskiold-Laurvig og Bille."

House of Ahlefeldt-Laurvig-Lehn 
Patent 1905 for count F. L. V. Ahlefeldt-Laurvig and his oldest son with name Ahlefeldt-Laurvig-Lehn.

Coat of arms: "Hvidt kors mellem 1. Grevskabet Laurvig, 2. og 3. Lehn, 4. Grevskabet Langeland; midterskjold: Ahlefeldt, Danneskiold-Laurvig og Lehn."

See also
Jarlsberg - the other countship in Norway

References

Larvik
House of Ahlefeldt